89.7 Prime FM (DXPD 89.7 MHz) is an FM station owned and operated by Prime Broadcasting Network. Its studios and transmitter are located at Door #2, Villanueva Bldg., Allah Valley Dr., Surallah.

References

External links
Prime FM Surallah FB Page

Radio stations in South Cotabato
Radio stations established in 2016